Palestro was an ironclad warship, the second and final member of the , built for the Italian Regia Marina (Royal Navy) in the 1860s and 1870s. She was armed with a battery of six  guns and one  gun.

Obsolescent before she entered service, Palestro had an uneventful career. She served primarily in Italy's colonial empire and did not see action. In 1880, she took part in an international naval demonstration off Ragusa to enforce the Treaty of Berlin. Palestro was employed in the defense of La Maddalena from 1889 to 1894, and thereafter as a training ship. She was stricken from the naval register in 1900 and broken up for scrap in 1902–1904.

Design

Her superstructure consisted of a small conning tower. She had a crew of 548 officers and men.

Her propulsion system consisted of one single-expansion steam engine that drove a single screw propeller, with steam supplied by six coal-fired, cylindrical fire-tube boilers that were vented through a single funnel placed directly aft of the conning tower. The ship was barque-rigged to supplement the steam engine; Palestro and her sister were the last rigged ironclads to be built by Italy.

Palestro was armed with a main battery of six  guns, mounted in three armored casemates. The first was located forward, toward the bow, the second and third were placed close to the stern on each side of the ship. A  gun was mounted forward as a bow chaser.

Service history
The keel for Palestro was laid down at the Regio Cantiere di Castellammare di Stabia shipyard in August 1865. The ship was named for the gunboat , which had been sunk at the Battle of Lissa in 1866. The date of her launched is unknown, though surviving records indicate either 30 September or 2 October 1871. The ship was completed on 11 July 1875, after almost a decade of work. Obsolescent by the time she was completed, Palestro primarily served in the Italian colonial empire, which Italy had begun acquiring in the 1880s. She occasionally took part in training maneuvers with the main Italian fleet throughout her career.

On 14 November 1880 she assisted with the refloating of the P&O steamship , which had run aground at Brindisi. Also in that month, Palestro and the ironclad  took part in a naval demonstration off Ragusa in an attempt to force the Ottoman Empire to comply with the terms of the Treaty of Berlin and turn over the town of Ulcinj to Montenegro. Palestro was used as a headquarters ship for the ships defending La Maddalena from 1889 to 1894. She was then used as a training ship for coxswains. Palestro was stationed in La Spezia in 1895 as a special service ship. The ship was stricken from the naval register on 14 April 1900 and broken up for scrap between 1902 and 1904.

Notes

References

External links
 Palestro Marina Militare website 

Palestro
Ships built in La Spezia
1871 ships